Turritella is a genus of medium-sized sea snails with an operculum, marine gastropod mollusks in the family Turritellidae.

They have tightly coiled shells, whose overall shape is basically that of an elongated cone.

The name Turritella comes from the Latin word turritus meaning "turreted" or "towered" and the diminutive suffix -ella.

Species

Valid
Valid species within the genus Turritella are listed below. Fossil species are marked with a dagger "†".

 Turritella acropora (Dall, 1889)
 Turritella albolapis Finlay, 1924
 Turritella algida Melvill & Standen, 1912
 Turritella anactor Berry, 1957
 Turritella annulata Kiener, 1843
 † Turritella apicalis - Pleistocene of Florida
 Turritella attenuata Reeve, 1849
 Turritella aurocincta Martens, 1875
 Turritella bacillum Kiener, 1843
 † Turritella badensis - Cenozoic of Denmark, Germany and Poland
 Turritella banksii Gray in Reeve, 1849
 Turritella bayeri Petuch, 2001
 Turritella bicingulata Lamarck, 1822
 Turritella broderipiana d'Orbigny, 1840
 Turritella caelata Mörch in Dunker, 1858
 Turritella capensis (Krauss, 1848)
 Turritella carinifera Lamarck, 1822
 Turritella chordata Suter, 1908
 Turritella chrysotoxa Tomlin, 1825
 Turritella cingulata Sowerby, 1825
 Turritella cingulifera G.B. Sowerby I, 1825
 Turritella clarionensis Hertlein & Strong, 1951
 Turritella cochlea Reeve, 1849
 Turritella columnaris Kiener, 1843
 Turritella communis Risso, 1826
 Turritella concava Martens, 1880
 Turritella conofasciata (Sacco 1895)
 Turritella conspersa Adams & Reeve, 1850
 Turritella cooperi Carpenter, 1864
 Turritella cornea Lamarck, 1822
 Turritella couteaudi Rochebrune & Mabille, 1889
 † Turritella crenulata Nyst, 1844 
 Turritella crocea Kiener, 1843
 † Turritella cruzadoi DeVries, 2007
 Turritella decipiens Monterosato, 1878
 Turritella declivis Adams & Reeve, 1850 
 Turritella dirkhartogensis (Garrard, 1972)
 Turritella duplicata (Linnaeus, 1758)
 Turritella dura Mörch, 1860
 Turritella elachista Rochebrune & Mabille, 1889
 Turritella exoleta (Linnaeus, 1758)
 Turritella fastigiata Adams & Reeve, 1850
 Turritella ferruginea Reeve, 1849
 Turritella fultoni Melvill & Standen, 1901
 Turritella fuscomaculata Bozzetti, 2009
 Turritella gemmata Reeve, 1849
 Turritella gonostoma Valenciennes, 1832
 Turritella hastula Reeve, 1849
 Turritella hookeri Reeve, 1849
 Turritella incisa Reeve, 1849
 † Turritella incrassata - Pliocene of Belgium
 Turritella knysnaensis Krauss, 1848
 Turritella leeuwinensis (Garrard, 1972)
 Turritella lentiginosa Reeve, 1849
 Turritella leucostoma Valenciennes, 1832
 Turritella ligar Deshayes, 1843
 Turritella lindae (Petuch, 1987)
 Turritella lyonsi Garcia, 2006
 Turritella maculata Reeve, 1849
 Turritella marianopsis Petuch, 1990
 Turritella minuta Turton, 1932 
 Turritella monilifera Adams & Reeve, 1850
 Turritella monterosatoi Kobelt, 1887
 Turritella nebulosa Kiener, 1843
 Turritella nodulosa King & Broderip, 1832
 Turritella praetermissa (Dautzenberg, 1912)
 Turritella punctata Kiener, 1843
 Turritella radula Kiener, 1843
 Turritella reevei Dautzenberg & Fischer, 1906 
 † Turritella riverae DeVries, 2007
 Turritella rubescens Reeve, 1849
 † Turritella salasi DeVries, 2007
 Turritella sanguinea Reeve, 1849
 Turritella sedanensis (Martin 1905)
 † Turritella steiningeri Harzhauser, 2007
 Turritella terebra (Linnaeus, 1758)
 † Turritella terebralis Lamarck, 1799
 Turritella torulosa Kiener, 1843
 † Turritella trempina - Pliocene
 Turritella triplicata Philippi, 1836
 Turritella turbona Monterosato, 1877
 † Turritella turris - Early Miocene of Central Europe
 Turritella ungulina (Linnaeus, 1758)
 Turritella variegata (Linnaeus, 1758)
 Turritella vermicularis (Brocchi, 1814)
 † Turritella vertebroides Morton, 1834 - Late Cretaceous of South of North America
 Turritella wareni Ryall & Vos, 2010
 Turritella willetti McLean, 1970
 Turritella yucatecana (Dall, 1881)

Invalid

These are species assigned to Turritella that were brought into synonymy with other taxa:
 Turritella (Torcula) Gray, 1847: synonym of Turritella Lamarck, 1799
 Turritella (Torcula) cochlea Reeve, 1849: synonym of Turritella cochlea Reeve, 1849
 Turritella acicula Stimpson, 1851: synonym of Turritellopsis stimpsoni (Dall, 1919)
 Turritella alternata Say, 1822: synonym of Bittiolum alternatum (Say, 1822)
 † Turritella andenensis Otuka, 1934: synonym of Neohaustator andenensis (Otuka, 1934)
 Turritella aquila Reeve, 1849: synonym of Turritella conspersa Adams & Reeve, 1850
 Turritella areolata Stimpson, 1851: synonym of Tachyrhynchus reticulatus (Mighels & Adams, 1842)
 Turritella auricincta Martens, 1875: synonym of Turritella aurocincta Martens, 1875
 Turritella bicolor Adams & Reeve, 1850: synonym of Turritella cingulifera G.B. Sowerby I, 1825
 Turritella brevialis Lamarck, 1822: synonym of Mesalia brevialis (Lamarck, 1822)
 Turritella canaliculata Adams & Reeve, 1850: synonym of Turritella cingulifera G.B. Sowerby I, 1825
 Turritella candida Reeve, 1849: synonym of Turritella gemmata Reeve, 1849
 Turritella cingulata Sowerby, 1825 is a synonym of Incatella cingulata (Sowerby, 1825)
 Turritella concava Say, 1826: synonym of Terebra concava (Say, 1826)
 Turritella congelata Adams & Reeve, 1850: synonym of Colpospira congelata (Adams & Reeve, 1850)
 Turritella costulata Mighels & Adams, 1842: synonym of Acirsa borealis (Lyell, 1841)
 Turritella costulata Møller, 1842: synonym of Eumetula arctica (Mørch, 1857)
 Turritella crenulata (Donald, 1900): synonym of Colpospira joannae (Hedley, 1923)  
 Turritella erosa Couthouy, 1838: synonym of Tachyrhynchus erosus (Couthouy, 1838)
 Turritella eschrichti Hölböll in Möller, 1842: synonym of Acirsa borealis (Lyell, 1841)
 Turritella excavata G. B. Sowerby III, 1870: synonym of Turritella declivis Adams & Reeve in Reeve, 1849 
 Turritella flammulata Kiener, 1843-44: synonym ofTurritella ligar Deshayes, 1843
 Turritella fortilirata G. B. Sowerby III, 1914: synonym of Neohaustator fortilirata (G. B. Sowerby III, 1914)
 Turritella gracillima Gould, 1860: synonym of Turritella cingulifera G. B. Sowerby I, 1825 
 Turritella granosa Quoy & Gaimard, 1834: synonym of Opalia granosa (Quoy & Gaimard, 1834)
 Turritella imbricata (Linnaeus, 1758): synonym of Turritella variegata (Linnaeus, 1758)
 Turritella knysnaensis Krauss, 1848: synonym of Turritella capensis (Krauss, 1848)
 Turritella lactea Möller, 1842: synonym of Mesalia lactea (Möller, 1842)
 † Turritella maiquetiana Weisbord, 1962: synonym of Turritella paraguanensis Hodson, 1926
 Turritella mediolevis Verco, 1910: synonym of Colpospira mediolevis (Verco, 1910) 
 Turritella meta Reeve, 1849: synonym of Turritella gemmata
 Turritella monterosatoi Kobelt, 1887: synonym of Turritella turbona Monterosato, 1877
 Turritella nzimaorum Ryall & Vos, 2010: synonym of Turritella caelata Mörch in Dunker, 1858
 Turritella opalina Adams & Reeve, 1850: synonym of Mesalia opalina (Adams & Reeve, 1850)
 Turritella opulenta Hedley, 1907: synonym of Glyptozaria opulenta (Hedley, 1907)
 Turritella paraguanensis Hodson, 1926: synonym of Turritella variegata (Linnaeus, 1758)
 Turritella philippi Aradas, 1842: synonym of Acirsa subdecussata (Cantraine, 1835)
 Turritella polaris Möller, 1842: synonym of Tachyrhynchus erosus (Couthouy, 1838)
 Turritella spina Crosse & Fischer, 1864: synonym of Cingulina spina (Crosse & Fischer, 1864)
 Turritella reticulata Mighels & Adams, 1842: synonym of Tachyrhynchus reticulatus (Mighels & Adams, 1842)
 Turritella spirata Sowerby I, 1825: synonym of Eglisia spirata (Sowerby I, 1825)
 Turritella symmetrica Hutton, 1873: synonym of Stiracolpus symmetricus (Hutton, 1873)
 Turritella trisulcata Lamarck, 1822: synonym of Turritella vermicularis
 Turritella yucatecanum Dall, 1881: synonym of Turritella yucatecana (Dall, 1881)

Fossil species 

The genus is known from the Cretaceous to the Recent periods.

The shells are quite frequently found as fossils, and the carbonate stone made from large quantities of Turritella shells is often referred to as "Turritella limestone", or, if silicified, "Turritella agate". Both varieties of this stone are commonly sold as polished cabochons.

"Turritella agate"

One variety of "Turritella agate", that from the Green River Formation in Wyoming, is a fossiliferous rock which does indeed contain numerous high-spired snail shells. However, contrary to the common name, these snails are not in the marine genus Turritella, instead they are freshwater snails in the species Elimia tenera, family Pleuroceridae from the Eocene epoch. The rock in which these snail shells are so abundant varies from a soft sandstone to a dense chalcedony. This dense silicified rock is popular with gem and mineral hobbyists, as well as with New Age practitioners.

Turritellenplatte
The Erminger Turritellenplatte ("Turritella plate of Ermingen") near Ulm, Germany is a rocky outcrop situated in the northern part of the North Alpine Foreland Basin. It is famous for its superabundance of Turritella turris shells within its sediments and dates from the Burdigalian.

References 
 Caenogastropoda in Man and Mollusc

External links
 "1. Turritella bicolor; 2. Turritella congelata; 3. Turritella conspersa; 4. Turritella miltilirata; 5. Turritella vittulata; 6. Turritella monilifera; 7. Turritella opalina; 8. Eglisia tricarinata; 9. Turritella fastigiata; 10. Turritela declivis; 11. Turritella canaliculata", New York Public Library no-charge digital image available; image dated 1850.

Prehistoric life of Europe
Turritellidae
Cretaceous molluscs
Cenozoic molluscs
Extant Late Jurassic first appearances